Ali Asghar Fani is an Iranian politician and former Minister of Education. He took the office as acting minister on 23 August 2013 after parliament rejected nominated Mohammad-Ali Najafi for the post. He was officially nominated for the post by President Hassan Rouhani and was voted for by the parliament. He resigned from his position on 19 October 2016, as part of President Rouhai's cabinet reshuffling. He previously served as acting minister in 2005.

References 

1954 births
Living people
University of Tehran alumni
21st-century Iranian politicians
Education ministers of Iran
Politicians from Tehran
Impeached Iranian officials